The Trinidad and Tobago Rugby Football Union (TTRFU) is the governing body for rugby union in Trinidad and Tobago. It was founded in 1928 and became affiliated to the International Rugby Board in 1992. It is also a member of the West Indies Rugby Union, the Trinidad & Tobago Olympic Committee and the North American and West Indian Rugby Association.

In May 2021, Maria Thomas was elected as the first female president of the TTRFU, defeating the incumbent Colin Peters.

References

See also
 Trinidad and Tobago national rugby union team
 Rugby union in Trinidad and Tobago
 Trinidad and Tobago national rugby union team (sevens)
 Trinidad and Tobago women's national rugby union team

Rugby union in Trinidad and Tobago
Rugby union governing bodies in North America
Sports organizations established in 1928